Cephalotes olmecus, also known as the gliding ant, is a species of arboreal ant of the genus Cephalotes. It is characterized by an oddly-shaped head and the ability to "parachute" by steering its fall after dropping from trees.

References

olmecus